John Leck Kay was a Scottish footballer of the 1870s and 1880s who played mainly as a left winger.

Kay's first senior club was Third Lanark where he won a Scottish Cup runners-up medal in 1878. He moved to Queen's Park in 1879 where he won three successive Scottish Cup winners' medals in 1880, 1881 and 1882, plus two Glasgow Merchants Charity Cups. He returned to Third Lanark in 1883 and later had a short spell at Pollokshields Athletic before emigrating to the United States in 1887.

He was capped 6 times by the Scotland national team between 1880 and 1884, scoring 5 goals.

References

External links

Year of birth missing
Year of death missing
Scottish footballers
Scotland international footballers
Third Lanark A.C. players
Queen's Park F.C. players
Footballers from Glasgow
19th-century Scottish people
Scottish emigrants to the United States
Pollokshields Athletic F.C. players
Place of death missing
Association football outside forwards